Panj Peykar (also Romanized as Bāsh Ushka, Bash Ūshtā, Beshūrādeh, Beshūsqeh, Besh Yūsqeh, and Panj Beykar) is a village in Jafarbay-ye Jonubi Rural District, in the Central District of Torkaman County, Golestan Province, Iran. At the 2006 census, its population was 2,226, in 433 families.

References 

Populated places in Torkaman County